Joel Chan Shan-chung (born 2 October 1976) is a Hong Kong actor and singer contracted to TVB and Shaw Brothers Pictures. He made his debut in 1995 as a solo Cantopop singer, later transitioning into acting.

Chan won the Best Supporting Actor award at the 2017 TVB Anniversary Awards with his role as Kent in the action drama The Unholy Alliance.

In 2019, Chan played his first male leading role in the critical acclaimed supernatural drama Barrack O'Karma. With his dual role as Siu Wai-ming and Lau Yuk-fai, Chan earned his first nominations for Best Actor and Most Popular Male Character at the 2019 TVB Anniversary Awards, eventually being placed among top 5 for both categories.

In 2022, Chan won the Best Actor award with his role in supernatural drama Barrack O'Karma 1968.

Personal life 
In 2011, Joel Chan and Florinda Ho, the third daughter of "Gambling King" Stanley Ho, were repeatedly rumored to be in a relationship but the two denied the news. Joel Chan also admitted that he had gone through divorce procedures with his ex-wife Ponny Yeung with whom he had been in a relationship for 10 years at the end of 2010. In the early morning of August 14, 2011, Florinda Ho, the daughter of the rich businessman Stanley Ho, uploaded a photo on Weibo, officially publicizing the relationship. In 2013, he and Florinda ended their two-year relationship.

On November 1, 2019, Chan married his out of industry girlfriend, Apple Ho, after dating for 5 years. The two held a wedding banquet at the W Hotel in Hong Kong. On 14 February 2020, he announced on Instagram that his wife was pregnant. On July 1 of the same year, his wife gave birth to their 7.1-pound son, Jaco Chan, by caesarean section.

Due to their common interest in long-distance running, Chan along with Benjamin Yuen, Brian Tse, Jack Wu, Nancy Wu, Paisley Wu, Elaine Yiu, Selena Lee and Mandy Wong formed the group “Crazy Runner”.

Filmography

Television dramas (TVB)

Television dramas (Shaw Brothers Pictures)

Film
1999: The Social Worker from the Edge
2000: God's Family Hymnal
2003: Dream and Desire
2003: Mark Six Comedy
2004: Cop Unbowed
2004: A-1 Headline
2004: The Beautiful Life
2005: Futago
2010: 72 Tenants of Prosperity
2014: Grey Met Shrek
2019: Line Walker 2
TBA: Endless Battle

Discography
1994: A B C D
1996: 愛是全意 (Love is My Focus)

Other works
 Musicals
1996: Snow White as the Prince

 Music video appearances
 "一不小心" (Once Not Careful) by Nicola Cheung

 Soundtracks
 "天數" (Counting Destiny), theme song for A Change of Destiny
 Duet with Steven Ma

References

External links

Joel Chan's Official TVB Blog
Joel Chan's Official Sina Microblog

1976 births
Living people
TVB veteran actors
20th-century Hong Kong male actors
Hong Kong male film actors
Hong Kong male television actors
Hong Kong male singers
Cantopop singers
Macau emigrants to Hong Kong
21st-century Hong Kong male actors
Macau-born Hong Kong artists